Mac Dela is an Irish surname, and may refer to:

 Gann mac Dela, legendary joint High King of Ireland with his brother Genann.
 Genann mac Dela, legendary joint High King of Ireland with his brother Gann.
 Rudraige mac Dela, legendary second High King of Ireland.
 Sengann mac Dela, legendary High King of Ireland.
 Sláine mac Dela, legendary first High King of Ireland.

Surnames